The knockout phase of the 2010–11 UEFA Champions League began on 15 February and concluded on 28 May 2011 with the final at Wembley Stadium in London, England. The knockout phase involved the 16 teams who finished in the top two in each of their groups in the group stage.

Times are CET/CEST, as listed by UEFA (local times are in parentheses).

Format
Each tie in the knockout phase, apart from the final, was played over two legs, with each team playing one leg at home. The team that had the higher aggregate score over the two legs progressed to the next round. In the event that aggregate scores finished level, the away goals rule was applied, i.e. the team that scored more goals away from home over the two legs progressed. If away goals were also equal, then 30 minutes of extra time were played, divided into two 15-minute halves. The away goals rule was again applied after extra time, i.e. if there were goals scored during extra time and the aggregate score was still level, the visiting team qualified by virtue of more away goals scored. If no goals were scored during extra time, the tie was decided by a penalty shoot-out. In the final, the tie was played as a single match. If scores were level at the end of normal time in the final, extra time was played, followed by penalties if scores remained tied.

In the draw for the round of 16, each of the eight group winners were drawn against a second-place team, with the group winners hosting the second leg. Teams from the same group or the same association were not allowed to be drawn against each other. There was a single draw after the round of 16 that determined the pairings for all subsequent rounds. For this draw, there were no seedings, and teams from the same group or the same association could be drawn with each other.

Round and draw dates 
All draws were held at UEFA headquarters in Nyon, Switzerland.

Qualified teams

Bracket

Round of 16 
The draw for the competition's round of 16 was held on 17 December 2010. The first legs of the round of 16 were played on 15, 16, 22 and 23 February, and the second legs were played on 8, 9, 15 and 16 March 2011.

 

|}

Matches 

Shakhtar Donetsk won 6–2 on aggregate.

Tottenham Hotspur won 1–0 on aggregate.

Schalke 04 won 4–2 on aggregate.

3–3 on aggregate. Internazionale won on away goals.Real Madrid won 4–1 on aggregate.Barcelona won 4–3 on aggregate.Manchester United won 2–1 on aggregate.Chelsea won 2–0 on aggregate. Quarter-finals 
The draw for the three remaining rounds was held on 18 March 2011 at UEFA's headquarters in Nyon. There were no seedings in the draw and teams from the same country could now be paired together in play.

The first legs of the four quarter-final matches were played on 5 and 6 April, and the second legs were played on 12 and 13 April 2011.

|}

 Matches Real Madrid won 5–0 on aggregate.Manchester United won 3–1 on aggregate.Barcelona won 6–1 on aggregate.Schalke 04 won 7–3 on aggregate. Semi-finals 
The first legs were played on 26 and 27 April, and the second legs were played on 3 and 4 May 2011.

|}

 Matches Manchester United won 6–1 on aggregate.Barcelona won 3–1 on aggregate.''

Final 

The 2011 UEFA Champions League Final was played on 28 May 2011 at Wembley Stadium in London, England.

Notes

References

External links 
2010–11 UEFA Champions League, UEFA.com

Knockout phase
2010-11